The Minister for Agriculture is a minister within the Cabinet of Victoria tasked with the responsibility of overseeing the Victorian Government's agriculture initiatives. The minister is supported by the Department of Energy, Environment and Climate Action's Agriculture Victoria.

The current minister is Gayle Tierney since June 2022.

Ministers

Reference list  

Victoria State Government
Ministers of the Victoria (Australia) state government
!